The Joint Support Service (abbreviated: SKB, ; literally Armed Forces Foundation) is a branch of the German Bundeswehr established in October 2000 as a result of major reforms of the Bundeswehr. It handles various logistic and organisational tasks of the Bundeswehr. The SKB is one of six components of the Bundeswehr, the other five being the Army, Navy, Air Force, the Joint Medical Service, and the Cyber and Information Domain Service. As of April 2020, the force is composed of 27,840 personnel. In May 2021 the minister of defense Annegret Kramp-Karrenbauer together with inspector general Eberhard Zorn published a plan to dissolve the Joint Support Service and to reintegrate its units into the army, navy, airforce and cyber command.

Structure 

Unlike the similar British Defence Logistics Organisation and the Australian Department of Defence's Support Command Australia, a number of combat-associated commands were allotted to the SKB, principally the small German territorial defence structure embodied in the four Wehrbereichskommandos (Military District Commands), the national supervision of active German military operations beyond the NATO area, performed by the Joint Operations Command (the Einsatzführungskommando), which is headquartered in Potsdam.

The WBK headquarters were in Kiel (WBK I); Mainz (WBK II); Erfurt (WBK III); and Munich (WBK IV). Each Military District Command controlled several Landeskommandos (State Commands) due to the federal structure of Germany. Previously this function was carried out by the Verteidigungsbezirkskommandos (VBKs) or Military Region Commands (Defence District Commands). These commands were in charge of all military facilities in their area of responsibility and of several supporting regiments. The SKB headquarters was formed on the basis of the former IV (German) Corps headquarters. Most of its remaining elements have been reassigned from the Central Military Agencies of the Bundeswehr, encompassing a wide range of logistics agencies, schools, and other support units.

The top command authorities are the Kommando Streitkräftebasis (Joint Support Service Command) which is in charge of numerous of command and control roles. The Streitkräfteamt (Armed Forces Office) directs all schools, training and research centres, the Militärischer Abschirmdienst (Military Counterintelligence Service), and the Bundeswehr's higher academies and universities.

In April 2012 as part of the major reorganisation that ended conscription, the Joint Operations Command (German: Einsatzführungskommando) was resubordinated directly to the Inspector of the Bundeswehr.

In September 2022 annother reorganisation created the Territorial Operations Command (German: Territoriales Führungskommando) from parts of the Joint Support Service, which also was subordinated directly to the Inspector of the Bundeswehr. 

 Joint Support and Enabling Service Headquarters, in Bonn
 Military Studies Office, in Munich
 Federal Security Policy Academy, in Berlin
 German Military Representative at NATO & EU, in Brussels

Logistic Command 
  Bundeswehr Logistic Command, in Erfurt
 164th Special Pioneer Regiment, in Husum
  1st Logistics Regiment, in Burg bei Magdeburg
 161st Logistics Battalion, in Delmenhorst
163rd Logistics Battalion, in Delmenhorst
 171st Logistics Battalion, in Burg bei Magdeburg
 172nd Logistics Battalion, in Beelitz
 461st Logistics Battalion, in Walldürn
 467th Logistics Battalion, in Volkach
 472nd Logistics Battalion, in Kümmersbruck
 Logistics Centre of the Bundeswehr, in Wilhelmshaven
Motor Vehicles Centre of the Bundeswehr, in Mönchengladbach
 Logistics School of the Bundeswehr, in Osterholz-Scharmbeck

Military Police Command 
  Bundeswehr Military Police Command, in Hanover
  Military Police and Staff Service School, in Hanover
 1st Military Police Regiment, in Berlin
 2nd Military Police Regiment, in Hilden
 3rd Military Police Regiment, in Munich

CBRN-defense Command 
  Bundeswehr CBRN-defense Command, in Bruchsal
  CBRN-defense and Legal Protection Tasks School, in Sonthofen
  7th CBRN-defense Battalion, in Höxter
  750th CBRN-defense Battalion, in Bruchsal

Armed Forces Office 
 Armed Forces Office, in Bonn
Bundeswehr Verification Tasks Centre, in Geilenkirchen
Bundeswehr Service Dog School, in Ulmen
Bundeswehr Public Relations Centre, in Strausberg
 Bundeswehr Military Music Centre, in Bonn
Bundeswehr Sport School, in Warendorf

References

External links
www.streitkraeftebasis.de (engl.)

 
Branches of the Bundeswehr
Military units and formations established in 2000